Ozawa Dam  is a rockfill dam located in Hokkaido Prefecture in Japan. The dam is used for flood control. The catchment area of the dam is 12.2 km2. The dam impounds about 12  ha of land when full and can store 740 thousand cubic meters of water. The construction of the dam was started on 1973 and completed in 1994.

References

Dams in Hokkaido